Seçil Eris  a Turkish world and European champion Para Taekwondo practitioner. She competes in the K44 event of the -65 kg class.

Personal life
Seçil Er is a native of Çankırı Province's Yukarı Pleitözü  village.

Sports career
Before switching over to Para Taekwondo, Er played Para-badminton. Motivated by a kickboxer friend of her, she initially wanted to practice p,Para Taekwondo as a hobby. Her friend's coach helped her enter the upcoming Turkish Para Taekwondo Championships. In 2019 at age 27, she started her Para Taekwondo career.

She won the gold medal at the 2021 European Para Taekwondo Championships held in Istanbul, Turkey. She became champion at the 2021 World Para Taekwondo Chanpionships in Istanbul, Turkeyç She took the silver medal at the 2022 European Taekwondo Championships in Manchester, United Kingdom.

References

Sportspeople from Çankırı
Paralympic taekwondo practitioners of Turkey
Turkish female taekwondo practitioners
Year of birth missing (living people)
Living people
21st-century Turkish women